Umm-e-Kulsoom (ام کلثوم) is a Pakistani television series aired during 2011 on ARY Digital. It is directed and produced by Babar Javed. The serial has an ensemble cast consisting of Aamina Sheikh, Hasan Ahmed, Neelam Muneer, Zaheen Tahira, Jahanara Hai, 
Ismat Zaidi, Sami Khan and Faisal Qureshi.

Plot
The story is about a middle class girl, Umm-e-Kulsoom, who is good at singing. She is the favourite child of her mother Maryam. She is engaged to her maternal cousin Moosa but her sister Ruqaiyya creates problems for her and Moosa. Later, Umm-e-Kulsoom becomes a big singer and marries Nihal.

Cast
Aamina Sheikh as Umm-e-Kulsoom
Faisal Qureshi as Nihal
Zaheen Tahira as Dadi
Neelam Muneer as Ruqaiyya
Hasan Ahmed as Umm-e-Kulsoom's brother
Afshan Qureshi as mother of Maryam's daughter-in-law
Ismat Zaidi as Maryam
Jahanara Hai as Rahna
Sami Khan as Moosa
Sonya Hussain
 Rida Isfahani  as Zainab

Lux Style Awards
 '''''Best TV Actress (Satellite)-Aamina Sheikh-Nominated

References

Pakistani drama television series
2011 Pakistani television series debuts